Estonian Canoeing Federation (abbreviation ECF) is one of the sport governing bodies in Estonia which deals with canoeing.

ECF is established in 1951 as Estonian SSR Canoeing Federation. ECF is re-established in 1990. ECF is a member of International Canoe Federation (ICF) and Estonian Olympic Committee.

References

External links
 

Sports governing bodies in Estonia
Canoeing in Estonia
National members of the European Canoe Association
Sports organizations established in 1951